The Agricultural Competitiveness White Paper was produced by the Abbott Government, and released on 4 July 2015. It set out the Australian Government’s roadmap of measures to grow the agriculture sector.

The Paper

According to the Department of Agriculture, the White Paper outlines a $4 billion investment in Australian farmers and the competitiveness and profitability of the agriculture sector:

The Paper announced tax changes to assist farmers and encourage investment in water infrastructure and fencing, to mitigate droughts. It also includes money for roads and dam development, to assist in production and transport to markets; and five new agricultural trade counsellors help open up overseas markets. The Paper contained an $11.4 million boost to the Australian Competition and Consumer Commission (ACCC), and the engagement of a new Agriculture Commissioner at the ACCC, to encourage fair-trading and strengthen competition in supply chains.

The Paper added $300 million to the National Water Infrastructure Fund, established by the Abbott Government's White Paper on Developing Northern Australia.

External links
 Agricultural Competitiveness White Paper homepage

References

Abbott Government
Agriculture in Australia
White papers
Agricultural policy